YONSEI-KOICA Master's Degree Program is a master's degree program for public officials in developing countries jointly run by Yonsei University and KOICA. It aims to contribute to long-term development by enhancing the growth and stability of partner countries.

History 
The program began in 1997 as a small scholarship program to share Korea's unique economic development experience, also known as the Miracle on the Han River, with developing countries. It is provided to applicants who want to study in Korea for government officials of partner countries.

Purpose 
It provides opportunities for public officials in developing countries to pursue graduate programs in Korea, laying the groundwork for international development, women development, public health, public policy, fisheries science, agriculture and rural development in accordance with Korea's bilateral aid program. The goal of this program is to equip students with the ability to design and implement new policies and programs in the context of national development policies by benchmarking the Saemaul Undong experience in Korea. Courses are also designed to help students develop knowledge of the scientific research methodology needed to solve the various problems in government systems and rural areas.

Contents 
Fall and winter semester deal with the theory learning and spring semester focuses on the application of Saemaul Undong spirit and principles in the normal life as well as its implementation with Korean village people near Canaan Farmers' School. Fall semester of the second year will motivate students to contemplate what they should do to apply Saemul Undong to their own communities and societies.

References 

Yonsei University
KOICA's fellowship program
Scholarships in South Korea